The Redistribution of Seats Act 1885 (48 & 49 Vict., c. 23) was an Act of the Parliament of the United Kingdom (sometimes called the "Reform Act of 1885"). It was a piece of electoral reform legislation that redistributed the seats in the House of Commons, introducing the concept of equally populated constituencies, a concept in the broader global context termed equal apportionment, in an attempt to equalise representation across the UK. It was associated with, but not part of, the Representation of the People Act 1884.

Background
The first major reform of Commons' seats took place under the Reform Act 1832. The second major reform of Commons' seats occurred in three territory-specific Acts in 1867–68: 
the Reform Act 1867 applied to English and Welsh constituencies
the Representation of the People (Scotland) Act 1868 applied to Scottish constituencies and gave Scotland an additional quota of seats
the Representation of the People (Ireland) Act 1868 applied to Irish constituencies.

The latter United Kingdom set of Acts had fallen short of the Chartist aim to enfranchise and to equalise the electorates.  Electoral quotas diverged and the gap by 1885 widened; most starkly in the retention of boroughs of dubious size and a limited attempt at creation of new urban boroughs.  In reductions these previous reforms had rather merged into their surroundings those boroughs (historic towns) having fewer than 10,000 inhabitants as at the 1861 census. In a de-radicalising move a few of largest cities were given three MPs, whereby "no person shall vote for more than two candidates". As a result, the net partisan impact of these cities tended to be counterbalanced: for example, a borough formerly represented by two Liberals was now usually represented by two Liberals and one Conservative. In a Commons vote on party lines, the Conservative neutralised one of the Liberals, so that the borough counted for one party-based vote albeit having greater and slightly more equalised non-partisan local issue representation. By contrast the mid-size boroughs with two members such as the new creations – wherever they so happened to have two MPs of the same party – produced twice the voting power in the House as such cities.

By the 1880s, continued industrial growth and resulting population movements had resulted in an increased imbalance between the constituencies in terms of the numbers of MPs and the population.

The Third Reform Bill
William Ewart Gladstone, leading a Liberal government, introduced a Representation of the People Bill in 1884, which sought to greatly extend the franchise but not to alter the boundaries of constituencies. The Liberals had a large majority in the House of Commons, and the measure passed through the House easily. The House of Lords, on the other hand, was dominated by the Conservative Party. The Conservative leader, Lord Salisbury, was opposed to the bill. The majority of the Conservative party's MPs were elected by the counties, with the Liberals being electorally strong in the boroughs. He realised that the bill's extension of household suffrage into the counties would enfranchise many rural voters such as coalminers and agricultural labourers who were likely to vote for the Liberals. This, he claimed, would lead to "the absolute effacement of the Conservative Party". Salisbury hoped to use the Conservative majority in the Lords to block the bill and force Gladstone to seek a dissolution of Parliament before the reforms could be enacted. The Lords duly rejected the bill and returned it to the Commons, provoking outrage among the Radical wing of the Liberals. A campaign organised around the slogan "The Peers Against the People" called for reform or abolition of the Lords if they rejected the bill a second time.

The "Arlington Street Compact"
During October 1884 Queen Victoria intervened in what was rapidly becoming a constitutional crisis, urging the party leaders to meet and break the deadlock. Negotiations duly started at Salisbury's London home in Arlington Street, Westminster, between the Conservative leader and Sir Charles Dilke, a member of Gladstone's cabinet. Lord Salisbury agreed to allow the reform bill to pass on condition that a bill to redistribute parliamentary seats was also enacted; the two parties reached an agreement, the "Arlington Street Compact", whereby the bulk of MPs would be elected in single-member constituencies. He calculated that this would minimise the adverse effect on the Conservatives of the extension of the vote: dividing the counties would allow Liberal-voting and Conservative-voting districts to be separated. The division of boroughs would allow the suburban areas of towns to be represented separately from the inner cities, allowing the growth of "Villa Toryism". Dilke, a member of the Radical (socially progressive) wing of the Liberal Party, also favoured the division of boroughs to weaken the influence of the Whig faction in the party. Before 1885 many existing two-member boroughs one Whig and one Radical were nominated by agreement, often leading to uncontested elections.

The Boundary Commissions
Three boundary commissions were appointed in late 1884, one for England and Wales, one for Scotland and one for Ireland. Each commission was given similar instructions.

In dividing the counties they were to use Ordnance Survey maps and other documents in order to determine the boundaries of divisions. In doing so they were to ensure that each division of a county was to have an equal population "so far as practicable". In addition they were instructed "in all those cases where there are populous localities of an urban character to include them in one and the same division, unless this cannot be done without grave inconvenience, and involving boundaries of a very irregular and objectionable character". Subject to these rules, the divisions were to be as compact as possible and should be based on "well known local areas" such as petty sessional divisions or other aggregations of parishes. If necessary, an individual parish or parishes could be added to existing areas in order to equalise population, but under no circumstances was a parish to be divided. The county divisions were to be named after an "important town or place" within it, "preference being given to any merged borough or boroughs, or when it consists mainly of a well-known area, from that area". When the commissioners had devised a scheme of divisions for a county the details were to be advertised in the local press. A date would then be announced when one of the commissioners would attend at "a principal town" in the county to hear objections or proposed alterations.

The procedure for boroughs (or burghs in Scotland) was similar. Firstly the commissioners were to determine whether the present boundaries, or the boundaries proposed in the bill, embraced "the whole of the population which ought to be included within the borough". They could decide if an area formed a "community of interest" with the town and should be included within the borough boundaries. Where suburban areas had a sufficiently large population and distinct identity they might form a county division rather than be included in the borough. If boroughs were extended, existing "well-established" boundaries were to be used if possible. Where boroughs were to be divided, the population of each division was to be approximately equal, and "special regard" was to be had to the "pursuits of the population". This was clearly understood as meaning that working class and middle class parts of towns were to be separated where possible.

Passage through parliament

The Bill was introduced to the House of Commons by the Prime Minister William Gladstone on 1 December 1884. The Bill was seen as a compromise measure, and did not include proportional representation. This led to unrest among the Liberals. Leonard Courteney, Financial Secretary to the Treasury, felt forced to resign his post and the party whip. Gladstone had held a meeting with Liberal MPs earlier in the day at the Foreign Office, where he defended the bill. He stated that far from being a compromise it was very much a government bill, and that the discussions with the opposition had been conducted with "no party bias". The bill received its second reading on 4 December 1884, and was then sent forward to the committee stage, which was to commence on 19 February 1885. The delay was to allow the boundary commissions to complete their work, with the boundaries and names of the new constituencies to be included as the schedules of the final Act.

In committee few changes were made to the boundaries recommended by the commissioners. However the committee felt that the proposed names for many of the divisions were unfamiliar, and preferred to use what they termed "geographical" names incorporating a compass point. A compromise was made where both were incorporated in the names of many of the constituencies: thus the seat officially called the "Northern or Biggleswade Division of Bedfordshire" was informally referred to as "Biggleswade", the "Biggleswade Division", "Northern Bedfordshire" or "North Bedfordshire".

The act received Royal Assent on 25 June, and the provisions of both the redistribution and representation acts first came into use at the 1885 general election.

Provisions
The committee's work coupled with the Arlington Street Compact resulted a major redistribution under the Act as follows:
Parliamentary boroughs (later known as borough constituencies):
All these units with a population of 15,000 or less ceased to have separate representation and were merged into a wider division (constituency) of their county – namely 79 constituencies were disenfranchised.
Six other boroughs were also merged into the county divisions: four that included large extents of countryside (Aylesbury, Cricklade, East Retford, Shoreham) and two that had been disenfranchised for corruption (Macclesfield and Sandwich).
Those with populations between 15,000 and 50,000 were to have their representation reduced from two MPs to one, namely 76 constituencies.
Those with populations of more than 50,000 (23 in all) continued to be a set of two-member constituencies
The City of London would have its representation reduced to two MPs and remain undivided
The Universities of Oxford, Cambridge, and Dublin would each return two MPs.
Two low-population English counties lost an MP: Rutland was reduced to one MP and Herefordshire to two MPs.
The number of seats in the Commons was increased from 652 to 670, inclusive of Ireland.

Apart from boundary changes, approximately 160 seats were new (or "liberated" as Gladstone described it) in England and Wales. The number of seats in Scotland was increased by 12, and the representation of Ireland in Parliament remained at 103 members, even though its population had declined relative to the rest of the United Kingdom, due to emigration which had continued since the famine. This arrangement was described by The Times as "...obviously dictated by a somewhat pusillanimous [weak-hearted] calculation that it was better to avoid a struggle with the Parnellite party."

The number of seats had been fixed at 658 in the 1832 and 1867–8 legislation, but two two-member boroughs (Beverley and Bridgwater) and two single-member boroughs (Cashel and Sligo) had been disenfranchised for corruption.

Consequences

Cessation of dual-MP constituency pacts and majority-minority appeal
The reduction in the number of two-member constituencies (elected by the bloc vote system) ended cross-party cooperation: before the Act, in many counties and boroughs the two main parties had agreed to nominate one candidate each, and no election was held. Contested elections became the norm after the Act: 657 of 670 seats were contested at the 1885 general election.

Recognition of the middle and working classes

The division of former two-member constituencies had a direct, clear consequence: it hastened the decline of the domination of Parliament by the aristocracy (formed of those who had won Royal and often military favour and their heirs, many of whom were accurately referred to as the 'landed gentry').  After 1885, for the first time, MPs connected to industry and commerce outnumbered those closely related to the gentry. The Lords immediately stood out therefore as non-representative of the electorate; the "household suffrage" of 1885 gave the majority of men the vote; and by the end of 1918 all those aged over 21 could vote and some women.

Nonetheless, the Lords and their sons, grandsons and nephews in the Commons continued to form the greater part of the Cabinet until the Asquith ministry – further, the Lords legally bore equal strength, save for their inability to initiate bills spending public funds since 1407, until Asquith's constitutional Parliament Act 1911. The House of Lords could veto or amend bills sent to them by the Commons.

Electoral results and impact on strategy and attitudes
Immediate expansion of the working class electorate caused the number of 'Lib/Lab' MPs to rise from 2 in 1874 to 13 in 1885. The Act's new seats saw a 1% single-party swing to the Conservatives and so a gain of only 10 seats and a similar gain of 11 seats by Independent Liberals, the latter often slightly more radical (redistributive) than both mainstream parties.

The sudden balance of power of the seats held or won by Irish Parliamentary Party candidates galvanised those opposed to Home Rule. This third party power of veto coupled with the end of local electoral pacts in a foreseeable way; Disraeli and Gladstone needed central control of their members to pursue narrower narratives and promote differing values.  The IPP were often labelled particularly by the media and Conservatives as 'Parnellites'. Their power saw Gladstone make Home Rule his touchstone but, in so doing, distance his party from most peers who, until the House of Lords was flooded with Liberal peers in 1911, preferred conservative policies and guarded their near-equal power. Peers of the Whig persuasion flocked to a conservative line given immediate loss of family ties (hence leverage) in the Commons and tide of reformist policies engulfing the Liberal party caused by the Act's generous franchise and loss of their coveted and often sponsored Whig-Radical and Whig-Conservative dual-member seats in the Commons. In short most peers felt change had gone far and fast enough. The opening words of free thought of the Lords, in its reply to the Queen's Speech came from the Duke of Abercorn who said:-

Liberal MPs opposing Home Rule rapidly formed a new party to stand at the next election in 1886, the Liberal Unionists who were willing to govern with Conservatives.

Liberals were unable to rely on any Lords' majorities (ratification) on their Bills from 1885 until the Parliament Act 1911. The 1911 Act ended the equal power of the House of Lords forever, constitutionally.

132 small areas ("parliamentary boroughs") were merged with part or all of their surrounding county constituency, all of which had previously returned two members. Courted for decades with the promise of for social change, religious freedom and free trade by Liberals, often served by a Radical-leaning alongside and a Whig-leaning MP, these boroughs had few Conservative MPs at most elections. Their substitute single-member seats where gaining suburban and wealthy rural parts particularly assisted the Conservative party, which took a position of national "strength and unity" in opposing Chamberlain's "radicalism" preferring instead education reform and opposing Gladstone's Home Rule "crusade" in favour of budgetary concessions and support for unionist Irish businesses. The ensuing Queens Speech showed the Queen was "...resolutely opposed [to Irish Home Rule]...convinced that I shall be heartily supported by my Parliament and my people."

The Conservative party thinkers and leaders in both houses had now enfranchised the majority of men trusting them to break the deadlock in their favour; in return they had espoused religious freedom and almost completely free trade. The Liberal Party may have won the 1885 General Election however the new Lords heavy antipathy and the Irish question tore the party apart.

The majority of multi-member seats saw cooperation before 1885 whereas under the new one-MP-per-constituency norm, cooperation as patron and protégé or to attract opposing voters was futile. Whig and the most progressive Radical candidates could now be branded "weak", "divided" or "distanced" from the line of Gladstone and his successors which proved a flaw in the broad congregation of the Liberal Party until the formation of the final splinter group of 1931. Conservatives depicted Gladstone's dogged advancement of Home Rule, notably his failed first and second Irish Home Rule bills in 1886 and 1893, an open dissent from Her Majesty, as the root cause of Liberal Party disintegration. This unorthodoxy combined with heavy defeats on other Commons bills in the House of Lords which began to hemorrhage more Whigs led to electoral landslide victories for the Conservative party in 1886 and 1895 to break the deadlock.

Redistributed seats: England

Redistributed seats: Wales

Redistributed seats: Scotland

Redistributed seats: Ireland

See also
 Apportionment Act of 1911
 Reform Acts
 Representation of the People Act
 The Parliamentary Franchise in the United Kingdom 1885-1918
 Uniform Congressional District Act

External links
Redistribution of Seats Act 1885, 48 & 49 Vict. C. 23

References

United Kingdom Acts of Parliament 1885
1885 in British law
1885 in politics
1885 in the United Kingdom
Election law in the United Kingdom
Election legislation